John Lester Miller (June 5, 1903 in Brooklyn – August 1, 1965) was an American rower who competed in the 1924 Summer Olympics. In 1924, he was part of the American boat, which won the gold medal in the eights.

References

External links
 
 
 

1903 births
1965 deaths
Sportspeople from Brooklyn
Olympic gold medalists for the United States in rowing
Rowers at the 1924 Summer Olympics
American male rowers
Medalists at the 1924 Summer Olympics
Yale University alumni